Parsa National Park is a protected area in the Inner Terai lowlands of south-central Nepal. It was established as a wildlife reserve in 1984. A bufferzone declared in 2005 comprises . Since 2017, it has the status of a National Park.

In the north of the protected area the Rapti River and Siwalik Hills form a natural boundary to human settlements. In the east it extends up to the Hetauda – Birgunj highway. In the south, a forest roads demarcates the boundary. Adjacent to the west is Chitawan National Park. Together with the Indian Tiger Reserve Valmiki National Park, the coherent protected area of  represents the Tiger Conservation Unit (TCU) Chitwan-Parsa-Valmiki, which covers a  block of alluvial grasslands and subtropical moist deciduous forests.

Before being converted to a protected area, the region used to be a hunting ground of the ruling class.

Vegetation
The typical vegetation of the park is tropical and subtropical forest types with sal forest constituting about 90% of the vegetation. Chir pine grows in the Churia Hills. Khair, sissoo and silk cotton trees occur along watercourses. Sabai grass grows well on the southern face of the Churia Hills.

An estimated 919 species of flora have been recorded including 298 vascular plants, 234 dicots, 58 monocots, five pteridophytes, and one gymnosperm.

Fauna
In May 2008, a census conducted in the reserve confirmed the presence of 37 gaurs. Gaur survey 2016 conductedby the Park shows that the number has been increased to 105. A survey combined with extensive camera-trapping conducted in 2008 estimated four adult Bengal tigers resident in the reserve.

A camera-trapping survey conducted in February 2017 for three months revealed the presence of 19 Bengal tigers. This indicates the rise in tiger population by three times in three years.

References

External links

 Department of National Parks and Wildlife Conservation: Parsa National Park
 Information of ICIMOD's Conservation Portal: Parsa Wildlife Reserve

Protected areas of Nepal
1984 establishments in Nepal